The 150th Infantry was an infantry regiment of the British Indian Army.  It was formed in Mesopotamia in May 1918, saw service in the First World War and the Third Anglo-Afghan War, and was disbanded in June 1921.

History

Background
Heavy losses suffered by the British Expeditionary Force on the Western Front following the German spring offensive in March 1918 resulted in a major reorganization of the Egyptian Expeditionary Force:
 two divisions52nd (Lowland) and 74th (Yeomanry) were transferred to France in April; they were replaced by the 3rd (Lahore) and 7th (Meerut) Divisions from Mesopotamia;
 nine yeomanry regiments were dismounted, converted to machine gunners and sent to France at the end of the same month; the 4th and 5th Cavalry Divisions were reformed with Indian cavalry regiments withdrawn from France and the 15th (Imperial Service) Cavalry Brigade already in Egypt;
 the 10th (Irish), 53rd (Welsh), 60th (2/2nd London), and 75th Divisions were reduced to a single British battalion per brigade.  They were reformed with nine Indian infantry battalions and an Indian pioneer battalion each.
In fact, the 75th Division already had four Indian battalions assigned, so of the 36 battalions needed to reform the divisions, 22 were improvised by taking whole companies from existing units already on active service in Mesopotamia and Palestine to form the 150th Infantry (3 battalions), 151st Sikh Infantry (3), 152nd Punjabis (3), 153rd Punjabis (3), 154th Infantry (3), 155th Pioneers (2), 156th Infantry (1) and the 11th Gurkha Rifles (4).  The donor units were then brought back up to strength by drafts.  In the event, just 13 of the battalions were assigned to the divisions and the remaining nine were transferred from Mesopotamia to India in June 1918.

Formation
The regiment formed three battalions in Mesopotamia in May 1918 with complete companies posted from regiments serving in the 15th, 17th, and 18th Indian Divisions.  All three battalions were transferred to India in June 1918.  The 2nd Battalion later took part in the Third Anglo-Afghan War in 1919 as part of the 16th Indian Division.  They were disbanded in India in 1920 and 1921.

Battalions

1st Battalion
The 1st Battalion was formed in Mesopotamia in May 1918 by the transfer of complete companies from:
2nd Queen Victoria's Own Rajput Light Infantry
4th Prince Albert Victor's Rajputs
8th Rajputs
13th Rajputs (The Shekhawati Regiment)
The battalion was transferred from Mesopotamia to India in June 1918 and joined the Ahmednagar Brigade in the 6th Poona Divisional Area where it remained in until the end of the First World War.  The battalion was disbanded on 15 April 1921.

2nd Battalion
The 2nd Battalion was formed in Mesopotamia in May 1918 by the transfer of complete companies from:
6th Jat Light Infantry
9th Bhopal Infantry
10th Jats
104th Wellesley's Rifles
The battalion was transferred from Mesopotamia to India in June 1918 and joined the Rawalpindi Additional Brigade in the 2nd (Rawalpindi) Division where it remained in until the end of the First World War.  In May 1919, it mobilized with the 45th Indian Brigade, 16th Indian Division and took part in the Third Anglo-Afghan War.  The battalion was disbanded on 15 June 1921.

3rd Battalion
The 3rd Battalion was formed in Mesopotamia in May 1918 by the transfer of complete companies from:
42nd Deoli Regiment
43rd Erinpura Regiment
44th Merwara Infantry
99th Deccan Infantry
The battalion was transferred from Mesopotamia to India in June 1918 and joined the Ahmednagar Brigade in the 6th Poona Divisional Area where it remained in until the end of the First World War.  The battalion was disbanded on 30 November 1920.

See also

 Indian Army during World War I

Notes

References

Bibliography

External links
 

British Indian Army infantry regiments
Military units and formations established in 1918
Military units and formations disestablished in 1921